The Table Mountain Rancheria is a federally recognized tribe of Native American people from the Chukchansi band of Yokuts and the Monache tribe. It is also the tribe's ranchería, located in Fresno County, California.

Reservation
Founded in 1916, the Table Mountain Rancheria is  large and in Fresno County, near Friant, California.  The reservation population is approximately eleven people, with 34 tribal members living in the general area.

Government
The tribe's headquarters is in Friant, and their tribal chairperson is Brenda D. Lavell.

Economic development
The tribe owns and operates Table Mountain Casino, Eagle Springs Golf Course, the Eagle's Landing restaurant, Mountain Feast Buffet, and TM Cafe, all in Friant.

Notes

References
 Eargle, Jr., Dolan H. California Indian Country: The Land and the People. San Francisco: Tree Company Press, 1992. .
 Pritzker, Barry M. A Native American Encyclopedia: History, Culture, and Peoples. Oxford: Oxford University Press, 2000. .

Yokuts
Mono tribe
Populated places in Fresno County, California
Native American tribes in California
Federally recognized tribes in the United States